Polyura nepenthes is a butterfly in the family Nymphalidae. It was described by Henley Grose-Smith in 1883. It is found in the Indomalayan realm.

Subspecies
P. n. nepenthes (Burma, Thailand, Indo-China, southern China, Hainan)
P. n. kiangsiensis (Rousseau-Decelle, 1938) (China: Kiangsi, Zhejiang)

Biology
The larva feeds on Leguminosae.

References

External links
Polyura Billberg, 1820 at Markku Savela's Lepidoptera and Some Other Life Forms

Polyura
Butterflies described in 1883